Jared Michael Retkofsky (born March 16, 1983) is a former American football long snapper. He played college football at Texas Christian University and was signed by the Pittsburgh Steelers as an undrafted free agent in 2007. 

Retkofsky earned a Super Bowl ring with the Steelers in Super Bowl XLIII over the Arizona Cardinals. He was also a member of the Seattle Seahawks, as well as the New York Sentinels and Hartford Colonials of the United Football League (UFL).

In 2015, he played for the Central Texas Wolf Pack of the National Public Safety Football League.

Professional career
As a free agent during the 2008 regular season, Retkofsky worked as a furniture mover.

He was re-signed by the Steelers on October 28 after long snapper Greg Warren was placed on season-ending injured reserve. Retkofsky served as the Steelers' long snapper through the rest of the regular season and playoffs as the Steelers won Super Bowl XLIII that year. Retkofsky was waived by the Steelers on April 30, after suffering a broken shoulder from a non-football related incident.

He then played for the New York Sentinels of the United Football League. Following the completion of the inaugural UFL season, Retkofsky returned to working for a moving company before being signed again by the Steelers.

Retkofsky re-signed with the Pittsburgh Steelers on December 21, 2009, replacing Greg Warren for the second straight season due to a torn ACL.

References

External links
Pittsburgh Steelers bio
TCU Horned Frogs bio

1983 births
Living people
Players of American football from Wichita, Kansas
American football defensive ends
American football long snappers
TCU Horned Frogs football players
Pittsburgh Steelers players
Seattle Seahawks players
New York Sentinels players
Hartford Colonials players